Dieter Jung may refer to:
 Dieter Jung (fencer)
 Dieter Jung (artist)